Electroadhesion is the electrostatic effect of astriction between two surfaces subjected to an electrical field. Applications include the retention of paper on plotter surfaces, astrictive robotic prehension (electrostatic grippers) etc. Clamping pressures in the range of 0.5 to 1.5 N/cm2 (0.8 to 2.3 psi) have been claimed.

An electroadhesive pad consists of conductive electrodes placed upon a polymer substrate. When alternate positive and negative charges are induced on adjacent electrodes, the resulting electric field sets up opposite charges on the surface that the pad touches, and thus causes electrostatic adhesion between the electrodes and the induced charges in the touched surface material.

Electroadhesion can be loosely divided into two basic forms: that which concerns the prehension of electrically conducting materials where the general laws of capacitance hold (D = E ε) and that used with electrically insulating subjects where the more advanced theory of electrostatics (D = E ε + P) applies.

References

Further reading 
 Monkman G.J., Hesse S., Steinmann R. & Schunk H., Robot Grippers, Wiley‐VCH, 2007.
 Monkman G.J., Electroadhesive Microgrippers, Assembly Automation 30(4), 2003.
 Monkman G.J., Workpiece Retention during Machine Processing, Assembly Automation 20(1), 2000.
 Monkman G.J., An Analysis of Astrictive Prehension, International Journal of Robotics Research 16(1), 1997.
 Monkman G.J., Robot Grippers for use with Fibrous Materials, International Journal of Robotics Research 14(2), 1995.
 Monkman G.J., Compliant Robotic Devices and Electroadhesion, Robotica 10(2), 1992.
 Monkman G.J., Taylor P.M. & Farnworth G.J., Principles of Electroadhesion in Clothing Technology, International Journal of Clothing Science & Technology 1(3), 1989.
 Guo J., et al., Electroadhesion Technologies for Robotics: A Comprehensive Review, IEEE Transactions on Robotics 36(2), 2020.
 Guo J., Bamber T., et al, Optimization and experimental verification of coplanar interdigital electroadhesives, J. Phys. D: Appl. Phys. 49 415304, 2016.
 Guo J., Bamber T., et al, Investigation of relationship between interfacial electroadhesive force and surface texture, J. Phys. D: Appl. Phys. 49 035303, 2016.
 Bamber T., Guo J., et al., Visualization methods for understanding the dynamic electroadhesion phenomenon, J. Phys. D: Appl. Phys. 50 205304, 2017
 Guo J., Bamber T., et al, Toward Adaptive and Intelligent Electroadhesives for Robotic Material Handling, EEE ROBOTICS AND AUTOMATION LETTERS, VOL. 2, NO. 2, APRIL 2017
 Guo J., Bamber T., et al, Geometric optimisation of electroadhesive actuators based on 3D electrostatic simulation and its experimental verification, IFAC-PapersOnLine, 2016
 Guo J., Bamber T., et al, Experimental study of relationship between interfacial electroadhesive force and applied voltage for different substrate materials, Applied Physics Letters, 2017
 Guo J., Bamber T., et al, Symmetrical electroadhesives independent of different interfacial surface conditions, Applied Physics Letters, 2017

External links
 Electroadhesive robotic climbers
 Electroadhesives for MAV perching
 Electroadhesives, combined with artificial muscles, for skin-like robotic devices including soft conveyors and crawlers 

Electrostatics
Robotics